Joe Crowley (born 1962) is a former U.S. Representative from New York.

Joseph Crowley may also refer to:

 Joseph B. Crowley (1858–1931), U.S. Representative from Illinois
 Joseph Martin Crowley (1871–?), member of the Wisconsin State Assembly
 Joseph Robert Crowley (1915–2003), American Roman Catholic bishop
 Joseph N. Crowley (1933–2017), president of the University of Nevada, Reno, 1978 to 2001
 Joe Crowley (presenter), British television presenter and broadcast journalist